Dwars door Gendringen was a cycling race held annually in Gendringen, Netherlands. It was disbanded in 2004.

Winners

References

Recurring sporting events established in 1937
Recurring sporting events disestablished in 2004
Cycle races in the Netherlands
Defunct cycling races in the Netherlands
1937 establishments in the Netherlands
2004 disestablishments in the Netherlands